Uncifera is a genus of epiphytic flowering plants from the orchid family, Orchidaceae. It is native to the Himalayas and to Indochina.

Species accepted as of June 2014:

Uncifera acuminata Lindl. - Nepal, Sikkim, Bhutan, Assam, Yunnan, Guizhou
Uncifera dalatensis (Guillaumin) Seidenf. & Smitinand - Thailand
Uncifera lancifolia (King & Pantl.) Schltr. - Vietnam, Assam, Bhutan, Nepal, Sikkim
Uncifera obtusifolia Lindl.  - Vietnam, Assam, Bhutan, Nepal, Sikkim
Uncifera thailandica Seidenf. & Smitinand - Yunnan, Thailand
Uncifera verrucosa Summerh. - Myanmar

See also
 List of Orchidaceae genera

References

External links

Orchids of Asia
Epiphytic orchids
Aeridinae
Vandeae genera